Philip Jacob Weiser is an American lawyer and politician who has served as the 39th Colorado Attorney General, since 2019. He is the Hatfield Professor of Law and Telecommunications, Executive Director and Founder of the Silicon Flatirons Center for Law, Technology, and Entrepreneurship, and Dean Emeritus at the University of Colorado Law School. He previously served in the Obama and Clinton Administrations in the White House and Justice Department. A member of the Democratic Party, he was elected Attorney General for the State of Colorado in the 2018 election, defeating Republican George Brauchler on November 6, 2018. He was re-elected in 2022.

Early life and education 
Weiser was born to an Ashkenazi Jewish family. His grandparents survived the Holocaust, and his mother Estare was born in the Buchenwald concentration camp in 1945.

After high school, Weiser studied political science at Swarthmore College, graduating in 1990 with a Bachelor of Arts with high honors. He then attended the New York University School of Law, where he was an Articles Editor for the New York University Law Review. He graduated from NYU Law in 1994 with a Juris Doctor degree and Order of the Coif honors.

Career

Law clerk and Clinton administration
After graduating, Weiser served as law clerk to Judge David Ebel of the Tenth Circuit Court of Appeals from September 1994 to August 1995. He was then a law clerk to Justices Byron R. White and Ruth Bader Ginsburg in the U.S. Supreme Court from September 1995 to August 1996. Following his clerkships, he was senior counsel to Joel Klein, the Assistant Attorney General for the Justice Department's Antitrust Division from 1996 to 1998.

Academia career 
In 1999, Weiser joined the University of Colorado Law School in Boulder as a professor of law and telecommunications. There, Weiser established the national center of excellence in telecommunications and technology law and founded the Journal on Telecommunications & High Technology Law. He also founded the Silicon Flatirons Center for Law, Technology, and Entrepreneurship and he wrote and taught in the areas of competition policy, innovation policy, and Internet policy.

From June 2011 through July 2016, Weiser served as the fifteenth dean of the law school, and he was named one of the National Jurist's most influential leaders in legal education. Through the Silicon Flatirons Center, Weiser developed a range of programs to build up CU Boulder’s support for entrepreneurship and has linked it to the local startup community. Some of the initiatives include Tech Lawyer Accelerator, the Corporate Counsel Intensive Institute and the Daniels Fund Ethics Initiative.

Obama administration 

In 2009, President Barack Obama appointed Weiser as Deputy Assistant Attorney General in the Justice Department's Antitrust Division. He took the post in July 2009, taking a leave of absence from the University of Colorado Law School. In 2010, President Obama named him senior advisor for technology and innovation to the National Economic Council Director, and he participated in a series of policy initiatives.

Attorney General of Colorado 

Weiser was elected Attorney General for the State of Colorado in the 2018 election, defeating Republican George Brauchler on November 6, 2018. Weiser took office in January 2019, becoming the first Democratic Colorado Attorney General in 15 years. Later that same month, Weiser withdrew Colorado from a lawsuit that his predecessor, Republican Cynthia Coffman, had filed against the Clean Power Plan.

In the 2022 Colorado Attorney General election, Weiser was re-elected for a second term, defeating Republican challenger John Kellner and winning over 54% of votes cast.

Catholic Church investigation
On October 23, 2019, Weiser released the results of an eight month investigation revealing that 43 Catholic clergy were credibly accused of sexually abusing at least 166 children throughout the state of Colorado since 1950. On October 16, 2020, it was revealed that all three of Colorado's Catholic Dioceses, the Archdiocese of Denver, the Diocese of Colorado Springs, and Diocese of Pueblo, had paid $6.6 million in compensation to 81 victims of clergy sex abuse within the past year, regardless of how long ago the abuse happened. On December 1, 2020, Weiser's final report revealed that there were an additional 9 credibly accused clergy and 46 alleged victims in both in the Archdiocese of Denver and its suffragan Diocese of Pueblo. Statewide, 52 Colorado Catholic priests were named in Weiser's final report as committing acts of sex abuse. Prominent Archdiocese of Denver priest Fr. Charles B. Woodrich, also known as "Father Woody," was among those listed. Father Woody was known for his work in local homeless shelters.

Personal life 
In 2002, Weiser married Heidi Wald, a physician, in Philadelphia, Pennsylvania, and they now live together with their two children in Denver.

Selected publications

Books
 Phil Weiser & Jon Nuechterlein, Digital Crossroads: American Telecommunications Policy in the Internet Age (MIT Press 2013) .
 Phil Weiser, Stuart Benjamin, Howard Shelanski & James Speta, Telecommunications Law and Policy (Carolina Academic Press 2012) .
 Phil Weiser, The Jury and Democracy: How Jury Deliberation Promotes Civic Engagement and Political Participation (Oxford University Press 2010) .

Articles

See also 
 List of law clerks of the Supreme Court of the United States (Seat 6)
 Attorney General Alliance

References

External links 

 Government website
 Campaign website
 Silicon Flatirons Center for Law, Technology, and Entrepreneurship
 Journal on Telecommunications and High Technology Law.
 Colorado Technology Law Journal. University of Colorado School of Law.

 

|-

 

1968 births
20th-century American lawyers
21st-century American politicians
Colorado Attorneys General
Colorado Democrats
Colorado lawyers
Jewish American people in Colorado politics
Law clerks of the Supreme Court of the United States
Deans of law schools in the United States
Living people
New York University School of Law alumni
Obama administration personnel
Swarthmore College alumni
United States Department of Justice lawyers
University of Colorado Boulder faculty
University of Colorado Law School faculty